Lisa Jên Brown is a Welsh actress and singer with the Welsh language folk band . She is originally from Bethesda, Gwynedd, north Wales and is the daughter of Welsh actress Linda Brown. They have two children.

Career 
In 2015, Lisa Jên Brown's band  won the best album award at the BBC Radio 2 Folk Awards. Their album, was nominated for the Welsh Language Album of the Year award in 2016.

Personal life
Brown is a supporter of Welsh independence. "The right to govern ourselves in an independent Wales would give us a solid vessel to navigate our future with empathy, knowledge and strength," she said. "We are a country with different attitudes and perspective, tradition and culture – but we've been colonised, forced to always be second class citizens in our own country. Having independence means many things… but what excites me is the value and status our indigenous language will have – as a nation we'd be much more confident speaking our words."

References

Living people
Welsh actresses
21st-century Welsh women singers
Year of birth missing (living people)
People educated at Ysgol Tryfan